Amalda tankervillii is a species of sea snail, a marine gastropod mollusk in the family Ancillariidae.

This gastropod (Swainson, 1825) is probably named for Charles Bennet, 4th Earl of Tankerville (or less probably his son).

Description
The size of the shell varies between 25 mm and 91 mm.

Distribution
This species occurs in the Caribbean Sea off Venezuela and down to Brasil.

References

External links
 

tankervillii
Gastropods described in 1825